The Turin Metropolitan Railway Service, simply known as SFM, is a commuter rail system serving the metropolitan area of Turin, Italy. The system comprises 8 lines operated by Gruppo Torinese Trasporti and Trenitalia, serving 93 stations.

The core of the system is the passante ferroviario, a tunnel running 8 km through the city from north to south at a maximum depth of 18 meters. The tunnel allows passengers to travel from Torino Stura station to Torino Lingotto station in 15 minutes.

Network

Future Projects

Rolling stock
: Minuetto (GTT)
: TAF (Trenitalia)
: MDVC and Vivalto (Trenitalia)
: Due Piani (Trenitalia)
: Minuetto (GTT)

References

External links 

  Official site

Transport in Turin
Passenger rail transport in Italy
Railway lines opened in 2012
2012 establishments in Italy
Turin Metropolitan Railway Service